Lili Damita (born Liliane Marie-Madeleine Carré; 10 July 1904 – 21 March 1994) was a French-American actress and singer who appeared in 33 films between 1922 and 1937.

Early life and education
Lili Damita was born Liliane Marie-Madeleine Carré in Blaye, France, on 10 July 1904. Her father was an officer. She was educated in convents and ballet schools in several countries, including her native France, as well as  Spain and Portugal. At 14, she was enrolled as a dancer at the Opéra de Paris.

Early career in revue, modeling and German film
As a teenager, she was performing in popular music halls, eventually appearing in the Revue at the Casino de Paris. She worked as a photographic model. Offered a role in film as a prize for winning a magazine beauty competition in 1921, she appeared in several silent films before being offered her first leading role in Das Spielzeug von Paris (1925) by Hungarian-born director Michael Curtiz. She was an instant success, and Curtiz directed her in two more films: Fiaker Nr. 13 (1926) and Der goldene Schmetterling (1926). Damita continued appearing next in German productions directed by Robert Wiene (Die große Abenteuerin; 1928), G.W. Pabst (Man spielt nicht mit der Liebe; 1926) and British director Graham Cutts (The Queen Was in the Parlour; 1927).

Hollywood career
In 1928, Damita was invited to Hollywood by Samuel Goldwyn and made her American film debut in The Rescue. She was leased out to various studios, appearing with stars and leading men such as Maurice Chevalier, Laurence Olivier, James Cagney, Gary Cooper and Cary Grant. Her films included box office successes The Cock-Eyed World (1929), the semi-silent The Bridge of San Luis Rey (1929) and This Is the Night (1932).

Personal life

Following a lengthy affair with Curtiz, she married unknown actor Errol Flynn in 1935 and retired from the screen. Flynn soon became one of Hollywood's biggest box office attractions, and in 1941 they had a son, Sean Flynn. The couple had an acrimonious  divorce in 1942. 
According to her ex husband's memoir My Wicked, Wicked Ways, Damita was unstable and violent throughout the tumultuous relationship.
She is portrayed by Barbara Hershey in the TV film My Wicked, Wicked Ways (1985) based on Flynn's autobiography. While living in Palm Beach, Florida, Damita married Allen Loomis in 1962, a retired Fort Dodge, Iowa, dairy product manufacturer, and spent part of each year living there. They divorced in the mid-80s.

During the Cambodian Civil War (Khmer Rouge reign), her son Sean Flynn was working as a freelance photo journalist under contract to Time magazine when he and fellow journalist Dana Stone went missing on the road south of Phnom Penh, Cambodia, on 6 April 1970. Although Damita spent an enormous amount of money searching for her son, he was never found, and in 1984 he was declared legally dead.

Death
Damita died of Alzheimer's disease on 21 March 1994, in Palm Beach, Florida, aged 89. She was interred in the Oakland Cemetery in Fort Dodge, Iowa, her last husband's hometown.

Selected filmography

Selected stage musicals
 On Dit Ça, Paris (1923)
 Sons o'Guns, New York (1929/30)
 Here's How, London (1934)

References

Bibliography

External links

 
 
 Photographs of Lili Damita dead link
 Photographs and literature
 Grave of Lili Damita

1904 births
1994 deaths
20th-century American actresses
20th-century French actresses
People from Gironde
French emigrants to the United States
American film actresses
French film actresses
French silent film actresses
Deaths from Alzheimer's disease
Deaths from dementia in Florida
Burials in Iowa
20th-century French women singers